Everon Pisas (born 13 October 1994) is a Curaçaoan professional footballer who plays as a winger for SteDoCo.

External links

Voetbal International profile 

1994 births
Living people
Dutch footballers
FC Dordrecht players
ACS Poli Timișoara players
Eredivisie players
Liga I players
Eerste Divisie players
People from Willemstad
Curaçao footballers
Association football wingers